Prauzhda is a village in Vidin Province in northwestern Bulgaria.  It is located in the municipality of Belogradchik. It is populated by Torlaks. Its population has decreased substantially since 1990, and many of the remaining inhabitants are over seventy years of age. The economic base of the village in farming and viticulture has declined in recent years.

References

External links
 Vidin-online

Villages in Vidin Province
Belogradchik Municipality